Peter William Rippon (born 22 August 1965) is a British broadcasting executive.  He is Editor of BBC Online Archive. Prior to this he was Editor of BBC Television's current affairs programme Newsnight.

Early life
Peter Rippon was born in Henley-on-Thames. He is the son of Robin Rippon and Susan Westcott. He has an older sister and younger brother and sister.

He attended the Gillotts School, a comprehensive school, in Henley on Thames in the South Oxfordshire district of south-eastern Oxfordshire.

He graduated from the University of East Anglia (UEA) with a BA in Philosophy and Politics, and gained an MSc in International Politics from the University of Southampton.

BBC career
Rippon joined the BBC in 1989 as a trainee. At Radio 4 he became (concurrently) the Editor of The World At One, PM, iPM, Broadcasting House and The World This Weekend. He has also edited Newshour for the BBC World Service. Rippon's programmes have won numerous awards including Sony Gold in 2007 for interactivity for PM.

Moving into television, on 7 November 2008 he was appointed the Editor of Newsnight. The previous editor, Peter Barron, became Head of PR for Google in the UK.

In 2011, it was found by BARB that the Newsnight audience was on average around 450,000. Ten years previously it was around 1 million. When Rippon was editor, Newsnight was named news programme of the year by the Royal Television Society (2012). It also won Emmy (2009, 2011) and Peabody (2010) awards under his leadership.

Newsnight item about Jimmy Savile
In late 2011, Rippon spiked an item about the history of the suspected paedophile Jimmy Savile on Newsnight. Rippon argued the decision was in part based on the Crown Prosecution Service reporting there was a lack of evidence. Internal emails revealed that his concern was over the fact the only evidence was from 'the women'. His Editor's blog gives the background of why he, at the time, came to the conclusions that he did. In October 2012, Rippon stepped aside from his role as Editor pending an independent review into his decision to drop the investigation into Savile. The Pollard Review into the incident investigated the decision exhaustively. It concluded Rippon's decision not to air the item was 'flawed' but 'done in good faith' and without undue pressure from his bosses. Rippon disagreed his evidence was 'flawed' setting out his reasons in evidence to the inquiry. In October 2012 the Chairman of the BBC Trust, Lord Patten, when interviewed on Radio 4's The Media Show about the Savile affair, remarked "Peter Rippon is a very distinguished editor who broke the story about service companies which we've been having to deal with ever since."

References

External links
 BBC Editors Blog
 Newsnight Editor's Blog
 
 Independent December 2009
 At a formal dinner

1965 births
Living people
Alumni of the University of East Anglia
Alumni of the University of Southampton
BBC executives
BBC Radio 4
British radio executives
Jimmy Savile
People from Henley-on-Thames